Orchard Park Central School District is a public school district that serves Orchard Park, New York.  The school district consists of 5,157 students in grades K-12 (four K-5 elementary schools, one 6-8 middle school, and one 9-12 high school).  The district superintendent is David Lilleck.

District 
Orchard Park's District Offices are located at 2240 Southwestern Boulevard West Seneca, New York. The current superintendent is David Lilleck.

Current administration 
David Lilleck–Superintendent
Dr. Lisa M. Krueger–Assistant Superintendent for Curriculum, Instruction & Pupil Services
Dr. Dean Ramirez–Assistant Superintendent for Personnel
Jeffrey R. Petrus–Assistant Superintendent for Business & Support Services
William F. Bosinski–Director of Facilities
Minser Bernys–Director Student Support Services & Special Education
Dr. Paul Pietrantone; Director of Special Programs
Sarah Hornung–Director of Technology & Chief Information Officer
Joseph Haier–Transportation Supervisor
David M. Hack–Director Physical Education and Athletics

Board of Education 

(term in office runs from July - June)
Dr. Christine Gray-Tinnesz; President (2020-2023)
Dwight Eagan; Vice President (2019-2022)
Ryan Cimo (2021-2024)
Kim Hughes (2020-2023)
Robert Mahany (2020-2022)
Dr. Jennifer Rogers (2020-2023)
Karen Sreniawski (2021-2024)

District history

Selected former superintendents 
Previous assignment and reason for departure denoted in parentheses
Lawrence Godfrey
W. Raymond Buell
C. Clifford McLean–?-1983
Charles L. Stoddart–1983-2004 (Principal - South Davis Elementary School, retired)
Paul J. Grekalski–2004-2005 (Superintendent - Frewsburg Central Central School District, placed on leave)
Joan D. Thomas–2005-2010 (Interim Assistant Superintendent for Curriculum - Orchard Park Central School District, named Principal of Holy Angels Academy)

Schools

Orchard Park High School 

Orchard Park High School is located at 4040 Baker Road. and serves Grades 9-12. The current principal is Jonathan Wolf.

History 
Orchard Park High School was built in 1960 as a Junior High school. It became the high school in 1976.

Selected former principals 
Previous assignment and reason for departure denoted in parentheses
Laurence C. Johnson–?-1946
Paul W. Seager–1946-1947
Elmer E. Handel–1947-1951 (Vice Principal - Orchard Park High School, named Supervising Principal of Orchard Park Central School District)
Winford Swanson–1951-?
Thomas Grant
Jack Ables–1971-1994 (unknown, retired)
Robert P. Farwell–1994-2008 (House I Principal - Orchard Park High School), retired)

Orchard Park Middle School

Orchard Park Middle School is located at 60 South Lincoln Avenue. and serves Grades 6-8. The current principal is Aaron Grupka.

History 
Orchard Park Middle School opened in 1949 as the Junior-Senior High School and became Orchard Park Middle School in 1976.

Former principals 
Previous assignment and reason for departure denoted in parentheses
Herman J. Bowman–1959-1967 (Assistant Principal - Amherst Central High School, named Assistant Superintendent of East Aurora Union Free School District)
Thomas H. Grant–1967-1982
Lurly L. Hunsberger–1982-1994
Joan Thomas–1994-2005 (Principal - Potter Road Elementary School, named Interim Assistant Superintendent of instruction)
James R. Higgins–2005-2007 (Assistant Principal - Orchard Park Middle School, named Director of Athletics for Orchard Park Central School District)
Jennifer L. Curci–2007-2010 (Assistant Principal - Casey Middle School, named Assistant Superintendent of Curriculum and Instruction of Niagara-Wheatfield Central School District)

Eggert Elementary School 

Eggert Elementary School is located at 3580 Eggert Road. and serves Grades K-5. The current principal is Terence Tryon.

History 
Eggert Elementary School was built in 1965.

Selected former principals 
Previous assignment and reason for departure denoted in parentheses
Peter J. Walders–1981-1999 (unknown, retired)
Gordon S. Kerr–1999-2004 (Assistant Principal - Orchard Park Middle School, named Principal of Union Pleasant Elementary School)
Lisa M. Krueger–2004-2009 (Teacher - Hillview Elementary School, placed on leave)
Mary Louise Stahl–2009-2011 (Principal - Immaculata Academy, named Assistant Principal of Saint Francis High School)
Lisa Krueger–2011-2012 (House Principal - Orchard Park High School, named Assistant Superintendent of Curriculum, Instruction and Pupil Services for Orchard Park Central School District)

Ellicott Elementary School 

Ellicott Elementary School is located at 5180 Ellicott Road. and serves Grades K-5. The current principal is Paul Pietrantone.

History 
Ellicott Elementary School was built in 1968.

Selected former principals 
Previous assignment and reason for departure denoted in parentheses
Mabel Parris
Robert D. Horvath–1968-1990 (unknown, named Assistant Superintendent of Instruction for Orchard Park Central School District
James C. Bodziak–1990-2002 (Principal - South Davis Elementary School, named Assistant Superintendent for Curriculum and Pupil Services of Orchard Park Central School District)
Dennis Fitscher–2002-2004 (Assistant Principal - Orchard Park Middle School, named Principal of Armor Elementary School)
John D. Stemlack–2004-2006 (Principal - East View Elementary School, named Principal of Scott Lake Elementary School)
Terry C. Spicola–2006-2012 (Gifted Education teacher - Eggert Elementary School, retired)

South Davis Elementary School 

South Davis Elementary School is located at 51 South Davis Street. and serves Grades K-5. The current principal is Christine Rassow.

History 
South Davis Elementary School is a K - 5 school built in 1952 that is located in the Southtowns of Western New York. South Davis is one of four elementary schools in the Orchard Park Central School District. It is located at 51 South Davis Street in the Village of Orchard Park. South Davis is proud to be a part of "village life" in Orchard Park. The school is conveniently located near Yates Park, the Orchard Park Municipal Building, the Orchard Park Historical Society, the Quaker Arts Pavilion and the Orchard Park Middle School.

Selected former principals 
Previous assignment and reason for departure denoted in parentheses
Charles Stoddart–1970-1983 (Teacher - South Davis Elementary School, named Superintendent of Orchard Park Central School District)
James Bodziak–1983-1990 (Teacher - Eggert Elementary School, named Principal of Ellicott Elementary School)
Barbara A. Chmura–1990-1998 (unknown, named Principal of Windom Elementary School)
David R. Lovering–1998-2005 (Assistant Principal - Orchard Park Middle School, named Principal of Willow Ridge Elementary School)

Windom Elementary School 

Windom Elementary School is located at 3870 Sheldon Avenue. and serves Grades K-5. The current principal is Philip M. Johnson.

History 
Windom Elementary School was built in 1957.

Selected former principals 
Previous assignment and reason for departure denoted in parentheses
Harold P. Rupp–1957-1972 (Principal - Lincoln Elementary School, retired)
Ronald E. Mellerski–1972-1998 (unknown, retired)
Barbara Chmura–1998-2002 (Principal - South Davis Elementary School, retired)
Charles A. Galluzzo–2002-2004 (Assistant Principal - Orchard Park Middle School, named Principal of Maple East Elementary School)
Wendy S. Gloss; 2005-2016

References

External links
School District Webpage

Education in Erie County, New York
School districts in New York (state)